The 1948 Stanford Indians football team represented Stanford University in the 1948 college football season. Stanford was led by fourth-year head coach Marchmont Schwartz.  The team was a member of the Pacific Coast Conference and played its home games at Stanford Stadium in Stanford, California.

Schedule

References

Stanford
Stanford Cardinal football seasons
Stanford Indians football